Fikret Ören (born 10 April 1969) is a Turkish cross-country skier. He competed at the 1988 Winter Olympics and the 1992 Winter Olympics.

References

External links
 

1969 births
Living people
Turkish male cross-country skiers
Olympic cross-country skiers of Turkey
Cross-country skiers at the 1988 Winter Olympics
Cross-country skiers at the 1992 Winter Olympics
Place of birth missing (living people)
20th-century Turkish people